Daniel Whitfield (born 1821, date of death unknown) was a Union Navy sailor in the American Civil War and a recipient of the U.S. military's highest decoration, the Medal of Honor, for his actions at the Battle of Mobile Bay.

Born in 1821 in Newark, New Jersey, Whitfield was still living in that city when he joined the Navy. For this action, he was awarded the Medal of Honor four months later, on December 31, 1864.

Whitfield's official Medal of Honor citation reads:
Serving as quartermaster on board the U.S.S. Lackawanna during successful attacks against Fort Morgan, rebel gunboats and the rebel ram Tennessee in Mobile Bay, August 5, 1864. Acting as captain of a gun, Whitfield coolly stood by his gun, holding on to the lock string and waited alongside the rebel ram Tennessee until able to fire the shot that entered her port. Whitfield courageously carried out his duties during the prolonged action which resulted in the capture of the prize ram Tennessee and in the damaging and destruction of Fort Morgan.

References 

1821 births
Year of death unknown
Military personnel from Newark, New Jersey
People of New Jersey in the American Civil War
Union Navy sailors
United States Navy Medal of Honor recipients
American Civil War recipients of the Medal of Honor